Damon and Pythias is a 1914 American silent epic film directed by Otis Turner and starring William Worthington, Herbert Rawlinson, and Cleo Madison. It is based on the Greek legend of Damon and Pythias set during the reign of Dionysius I of Syracuse. It was an ambitious production by Universal Pictures, made at a time when feature films were rapidly replacing short films as the leading format in cinema. For much of the opening reel the cast are introduced, appearing in their modern dress rather than historical costumes.

Cast

References

Bibliography
 Bowser, Eileen. The Transformation of Cinema, 1907-1915. University of California Press, 1994. 
 McCaffrey, Donald W. & Jacobs, Christopher P. Guide to the Silent Years of American Cinema. Greenwood Publishing, 1999.

External links

 

1914 films
1914 drama films
1910s English-language films
American silent feature films
Silent American drama films
Films directed by Otis Turner
American black-and-white films
Universal Pictures films
Films set in the 5th century BC
Films set in the 4th century BC
Films set in classical antiquity
Films based on classical mythology
1910s American films